Broadcom MASTERS, a program of Society for Science, is a national science competition for U.S. middle school students. The Broadcom Foundation launched the competition in 2010 and pledged $6 million over the next 6 years. In 2014, approximately 6,000 middle school students were eligible for entry and 2,054 students completed and submitted an application.

Overview 
The name MASTERS is an acronym for Math, Applied Science, Technology, & Engineering for Rising Stars. Each year, the top 10% of students from certain SSP-affiliated regional and state science fairs across the nation are eligible for entry in the Broadcom MASTERS competition. The first stage is an online application that consists of project information and other essays. On the basis of the online application, 300 semifinalists are selected and announced. The 30 finalists are selected from the pool of semifinalists, and the finalists are then invited to meet and compete with the other finalists in-person. From 2011 through 2014, finalist week has occurred in Washington DC. Judging occurs over three days and consists of project judging as well as a variety of STEM challenges performed by six teams of five students each. Judges weigh individual performance much more than combined team performance.

Awards (as of 2019) 
Broadcom MASTERS grand prizes include:

 Samueli Foundation Prize: $25,000 Grand Award for the top STEM student
 The Robert Wood Johnson Award for Health Advancement: $10,000 for showing most promise in health related fields
 Marconi/Samueli Award for Innovation: $10,000 Award for the top innovator with engineering skills and a project in electrical engineering
 STEM Talent Award: $10,000 sponsored by DoD STEM
 Lemelson Award for Invention: $10,000
 STEM awards (First and Second Place): to the top two students in each area of STEM (Science, Technology, Engineering, Math)
 First Place STEM Awards: $3500 stipend for a STEM-related summer camp and iPad
 Second Place STEM Awards: $2500 stipend for a STEM-related summer camp and iPad
 Rising Star Awards: Trip to observe International Science and Engineering Fair (ISEF). These awards are given out to the top 6th and 7th graders (at time of project application) that show the most promise.
 Team Award: A $200 STEM supply gift card is given out to each member of the team that performs the best during the STEM challenges.

Various awards are also given to all finalists as well as to the top 300 finishers and their teachers.

Winners

2011 

 1st Place: Daniel Feeny (Woodside, California)
 2nd Place: Benjamin Hylak (Oxford, Pennsylvania)
 3rd Place: I-Chun Lin (Plano, TX)

2012 

 Samueli Foundation Prize: Raymond Gilmartin (South Pasadena, California)
 Marconi/Samueli Award for Innovation: Jessika Baral (Fremont, California)

2013 

 Samueli Foundation Prize: River Grace (West Melbourne, Florida)
 Marconi/Samueli Award for Innovation: Eitan Acks (San Diego, California)

2014 

 Samueli Foundation Prize: Holly Jackson (San Jose, California)
 Marconi/Samueli Award for Innovation: Sahar Khashayar (San Diego, California)
 STEM Awards (First and Second places respectively)
 Science: James Roney (Santa Barbara, California) and Daniel Bruce (San Diego, California)
 Technology: Aditya Jain (Portland, Oregon) and Nikhil Behari (Sewickley, Pennsylvania)
 Engineering: Chythanya Murali (Little Rock, Arkansas) and Annika Urban (Pittsburgh, Pennsylvania)
 Math: Rajiv Movva (San Jose, California) and Jonathan Okasinski (Harleysville, Pennsylvania)
 Rising Stars Award: Annie Ostojic (Munster, Indiana) and Raghav Ganesh (San Jose, California)

2015 

The Samueli Foundation Prize: $25,000
Winner: Annie Ostojic, 13, of Munster, Indiana.
Project: A Novel Microwave Cavity Design Using Cylindrical Parabolic Reflectors to Optimize Energy Efficiency
Grand prize winner Annie Ostojic was awarded the Samueli Foundation Prize for her mastery of STEM principles and team leadership demonstrated throughout the rigorous weeklong competition. Her science fair project expanded upon knowledge she accumulated in prior competitions in order to apply science and engineering to innovating a more energy efficient microwave design. Ostojic performed complex experiments and designed prototypes to achieve the next level of creative solutions for environmentally friendly microwave cooking.

A three time Broadcom MASTERS participant, Ostojic won the Rising Star award as a 2014 Broadcom MASTERS finalist and represented the United States as one of 24 delegates representing 14 countries at Broadcom MASTERS International this year. Ostojic competed against over 2,400 entrants to return as a finalist of the 2015 Broadcom MASTERS.

Marconi/Samueli Award for Innovation: $10,000
Winner: Sebastian Mellen, 14, of San Diego, California.
Project: MathSuite: An Innovative Android App that Makes Dreaded Calculations FUN! Published on Google Play!
Sebastian Mellen was awarded the Marconi/Samueli Award for Innovation for his vision and promise as an innovator who, in the spirit of radio inventor Guglielmo Marconi, demonstrated aptitude and skill in technical and mathematical concepts both with his science fair project and throughout team challenges.

Mellen was inspired by teachers who struggle with grading students' self-written examinations and classmates who wrestle with math and physics homework. To make their lives easier, Mellen applied his math and engineering acumen to design and develop an Android app for smartphones that can do a broad range of algebra calculations that are routinely used in math, physics and other sciences.

STEM Award Winners:
Each of these finalists (first and second place award winners) were selected for demonstrated skills and promise in each of the disciplines represented by STEM. First place winners are awarded $3,500 and second-place winners receive $2,500, in each case to support the finalist's choice of STEM summer camp experiences offered around the country. Each STEM winner also wins an iPad.

Science Award:
First Place: Maximilian Du, Manlius, New York, for his project on a new method to measure and extract caffeine from drinks.
Second place: Hannah O. Cevasco, San Carlos, California, for her research on the healing properties of honey.

Technology Award:
First place: Manasa (Hari) Bhimaraju, Cupertino, California, for her project on a low-cost animated teaching tool for the study of elements in the periodic table with an interface for the visually impaired.
Second place: Anusha Zaman, Baton Rouge, Louisiana, for her project on the potential health effects of betel use.

Engineering Award:
First place: Avery P. Clowes, Bolton, Mass., for his project on an electrostatic generator.
Second place: Soyoun Choi, Melbourne, Florida, for her project on the effect of bilingualism on cognitive development in adolescents.

Mathematics Award:
First place: David Yue, Plano, Texas for his project on 3-D x-ray reconstruction processing and its application to cancer prevention. 
Second place: Madison A. Toonder, St. Augustine, Florida, for her project on the study on the effect of sunblock nanoparticles on oysters' ability to filter bay water.

Rising Stars Award:
Evelyn Bodoni, Centennial, Colorado, for her project on the prevalence and reasons for student cheating. 
Anish Singhani, San Ramon, California, for his project on an electronic system that lets a person use brain waves to control devices, such as a wheelchair and computer keyboard.

Scott A. McGregor Leadership Award:
Avery P. Clowes, Bolton, Massachusetts

2016

The Samueli Foundation Prize 
Eleanor Wren Sigrest, 13, Woodbridge, Virginia
for Rockets and Nozzles, and Thrusts, Oh My

A brief description of Eleanor's award-winning project by the Broadcom Foundation:

"Inspired to learn about cold gas rockets after the SpaceX’s Falcon 9 rocket explosion, Eleanor built equipment to force pressurized gas through different nozzles made with a 3-D printer. After collecting data on force, pressure and temperature, her conclusion of a 20-degree half-angle was the best compromise between a nozzle’s length and its thrust."

Robert Wood Johnson Foundation Award for Health Advancement 
Aria Eppinger, 15, Pittsburgh, Pennsylvania
for Roundup's Effect on Human Gut Bacteria

A brief description of Aria's award-winning project by the Broadcom Foundation:

"Aria tested the effect of residue from a common weed killer on human gut bacteria that showed it slowed growth of beneficial bacteria, throwing off the good-bad gut bacteria in people and potentially leading to serious diseases."

Marconi/Samueli Award for Innovation 
Kaien Yang, 14, Chantilly, Virginia
for iDiagnostic: Invention of an Early Detection Tool for Major Depressive Disorder

A brief description of Kaien's award-winning project by the Broadcom Foundation:

"Kaien developed an app called iDiagnostic that can predict the risk for mental illness with an accuracy of 93 percent. Combining a psychological evaluation with data from magnetic resonance imaging, Kaien’s work found a link between Major Depressive Disorder (MDD) and shrinkage of an area called the limbic system."

Lemelson Award for Invention 
Nathan Deng, 14, San Marino, California
for Drop by Drop: Manipulating the Surface Tension of Water to Find the Best Way of Cleaning

A brief description of Nathan's award-winning project by the Broadcom Foundation:

"Nathan Deng was awarded the Lemelson Award for Innovation for seeking to solve a real-world problem like effective cleaning through an invention. Nathan built a device to measure surface tension of water with a syringe, flexible tubing, a thermometer and a precise scale. By lowering surface tension, water can permeate through the crevices of dirty objects and lead to more effective cleaning."

STEM Awards 
Science Award

First place: Ananya Ganesh, Sandy Springs, Georgia 
for Bruxism: Using Myoelectric Signals to Treat a Common Health Problem

Second place: Cynthia Chen, Cupertino, California for A Novel Method for Reducing Water Consumption in Germinating Seeds

Technology Award

First place: Adishree Ghatare, San Jose, California
for A Software Application as a Learning Platform for Increasing Memory Retention of Definitions of Words

Second place: Shreya Ramachandran, Fremont, California for The Effect of Soap Nut Grey Water on the Environment

Engineering Award

First place: Brendan Crotty, Muskogee, Oklahoma for Comparative Study of Insulating Materials for a Gas Forge

Second place: Emhyr Subramanian, Aurora, Colorado for A Study of Super-Absorbent Polymers and their Effectiveness in Organic Waste Extraction

Mathematics Award

First place: Anushka Naiknaware, Portland, Oregon for Chitosan and Carbon Nanoparticle based Biocompatible Sensor for Wound Management

Second place: Olivia Lazorik, Fort Pierce, Florida for Climate Change Problem: The Effect of Ocean Acidification on the Growth and Coloration of Lysmata wurdemanni

Rising Stars Award 
James Fagan, Riverside, California
for A Wind Tunnel to Test for the Best Aerodynamic Characteristics for Flight on Mars

Ashini Modi, Shreveport, Louisiana for Dark Matter: The Hidden Universe

Team Award 
Each member of the team that best demonstrates their ability to work together, and solve problems through shared decision making, communication and scientific and engineering collaboration. The winning team included : Nathan Deng, Aria Eppinger, Anushka Naiknaware, Rachel Pizzolato, and 
Lucas Ritzdorf.

Scott A. McGregor Leadership Award 
Finalists select one student from the group based on their leadership abilities to represent their class as a speaker at the awards ceremony.
Winner: Nikolai Ortiz

References 

Society for Science & the Public
Science competitions
Youth science